The Dean Z Guitar is an electric guitar made by Dean Guitars starting in 1977 along with its counterparts, the Dean ML, Dean V and Dean Cadillac. It has the recognizable Dean headstock and the V shaped tailpiece. The body shape is similar to the body design of a Gibson Explorer.

History
The Dean Z, like its counterpart the Dean ML, was designed with the enhancement of tone, sustain and playability in mind. These models have dramatic string angles at the bridge and nut and a string thru body design featuring the original V plate. The added string length created by the exclusive headstock coupled with the original Dean neck design is how the Z achieves its "incredible ease of play".

Dean was ordered to halt sales of the Z in 2022 after legal action was taken against the company by Gibson Guitars.

Construction
The Z shape is also available as part of the Baby Series as a scaled down version. There is also a Z shaped bass guitar made by Dean.

See also
 Dean Metalman Z
 Lyn Z

References

External links
 

Z
1977 musical instruments